Rutaneblina is a genus of flowering plants belonging to the family Rutaceae.

Its native range is Venezuela.

Species:
 Rutaneblina pusilla Steyerm. & Luteyn

References

Zanthoxyloideae
Zanthoxyloideae genera